LX-14 and LX-14-0 are polymer-bonded explosives developed by Lawrence Livermore National Laboratory and used in nuclear weapons in the United States.

Ingredients 
LX-14 is made of HMX explosive powder (95.5%) and Estane and 5702-Fl plastic binders (4.5%).

Properties 
LX-14-0 has a density of 1830 kg/m3, detonation velocity of 8,830 m/s and detonation pressure of 37 GPa.

References 

Explosives
Polymer-bonded explosives
Lawrence Livermore National Laboratory